Helery Hälvin (born 12 October 1991) is an Estonian former competitive figure skater. She is a three-time (2014, 2016–17) Estonian national champion and has qualified to the free skate at two ISU Championships – 2016 Europeans in Bratislava, Slovakia, and 2017 Europeans in Ostrava, Czech Republic.

Early in her career, Hälvin was coached by Peeter Kulkov and Oksana Romanenko, and then by Irina Kononova and Alina Škuleta-Gromova through 2014–15. She switched to Anna Levandi in early May 2015.

Programs

Competitive highlights 
CS: Challenger Series

References

External links 
 

1991 births
Estonian female single skaters
Living people
Sportspeople from Jõgeva